Santiago de los Caballeros, often shortened to Santiago, is the second-largest city in the Dominican Republic and the fourth-largest city in the Caribbean by population. It is the capital of Santiago Province and the largest major metropolis in the Cibao region of the country, it is also the largest non-coastal metropolis in the Caribbean islands. The city has a total population of 1,173,015 inhabitants.

Founded in 1495 during the first wave of European settlement in the New World, the city is the "first Santiago of the Americas". Today it is one of the Dominican Republic's cultural, political, industrial and financial centers. Due to its location in the fertile Cibao Valley it has a robust agricultural sector and is a leading exporter of rum, textiles, and cigars. Santiago is known as "La Ciudad Corazón" (the "Heartland City").

Santiago de los Caballeros has historically been the capital of the country, and was an important strategic city in the Dominican War of Independence. The name of the city, Saint James of the Knights, refers to the Hidalgos de la Isabela, a group of knights who had come from La Isabela city to stay in Santiago. Sometimes the city is called Santiago de los 30 Caballeros (English: Saint James of the 30 Knights).

History
The name of the city (Saint James of the Knights) refers to the Hidalgos de la Isabela, a group of knights who had come from La Isabela to settle in Santiago. The colony originally was located in the town of San Francisco de Jacagua (now a suburb of the city) which was founded in 1495, but when it was destroyed by an earthquake it was moved to its current location in 1506. In granting in 1508 the Royal Privilege of Concession de Armas to the Villa de Santiago of Hispaniola, the heraldic emblem that was included in his shield was venerated. The royal decree signed by King Ferdinand as administrator of the kingdoms of his daughter Joanna I of Castile.

The city was devastated by another earthquake on December 2, 1562. The survivors settled on land belonging to Petronila Jáquez of Minaya, adjacent to the Yaque del Norte, which is the current location of the city's river. The domination of the French during the Peace of Basel (which yielded the Spanish part of the island to France in 1795) left its mark on Santiago. During this era Santiago began its modern urban planning. European neoclassicism is represented at the Palace Hall, built between 1892 and 1895, by a Belgian architect named Louis Bogaert. The late 1800s saw a peak of architecture in the city. Numerous residences were built in European styles, which make up the central core of Santiago.

Geography

Santiago de los Caballeros is located on a hilly terrain in the middle of the Cibao Valley in the Central Region of the Dominican Republic, one of the most fertile lands found in the island. The Yaque del Norte River passes by Santiago which is in between the Cordillera Central and the Cordillera Septentrional, two of the three major mountain ranges on the island of Hispaniola, forming the Cibao Valley.

Climate
Santiago features a tropical wet and dry climate under the Köppen climate classification. The average temperature varies little in the city, because the tropical trade winds help mitigate the heat and humidity throughout the year. December and January are the coolest months and July and August are the warmest. Santiago and the rest of the country are in the Caribbean and have a tropical climate, which, when coupled with the city's altitude, 183 meters above sea level, causes cloudy conditions to persist through much of the year. While the city lies within the Hurricane belt, Santiago is more sheltered than other parts of the country from hurricanes because of its location in the Cibao Valley.

Economy

Santiago's economy is mainly based by the commercialization and industrialization of its products and finished goods, production of goods in the free zones, and by commerce. The city has headquarters and branches of all the main stores, supermarkets, restaurants and financial entities of the country. The city also has several shopping centers and multinational companies.

Since it is the second-largest city in the Dominican Republic, it currently produces the second highest percentage of the nation's GDP, while also having one of the highest incomes per capita, and a large middle-class population. Telecommunications, such as; wireless phones, cable service, internet service and other services are important for the local economy. Tourism, to a lesser extent, also accounts for a portion of the city's economy.

Santiago, like most cities and towns in the Cibao valley, has historically benefited from the fertile lands of this region. This makes Santiago de los Caballeros an important area for farming and livestock. Santiago's industrial sector is also one of the most dynamic in the country. It has the concentration of 15% of domestic industries. This means 308 manufacturing companies, which in 2004 employed more than 14,000 people or 12% of the labor of Dominican manufacturing work. The products range from cigars, coffee, and alcoholic beverages, to concrete, plywood and sheet products.

The Mercado Modelo on Calle del Sol is a shopping center where there are various stores of handicrafts and native articles made by hand.

Growth and development
Santiago has recently experienced an era of rapid growth and development. It has become a city of great importance for the nation and the region's development. The approximate population of Santiago was about 1,343,423 inhabitants as of 2021, making it the second most populous city in the Dominican Republic and the fourth-largest in the Caribbean (behind Santo Domingo, Havana, and Port-au-Prince), as well as the largest city that isn't a capital (although it once was).

Arts and culture

Architecture

The Victorian era was the zenith of architecture in the city. Numerous residences were built in this European style, which makes up the historic center of Santiago. The neo-classical gothic Cathedral of Santiago was built in 1895 by Onofre de Lora, an architect native to the city.

The Hermanos Patiño Bridge is both the largest and oldest bridge in the city connecting the North and South sides of the city of Santiago. Its construction was started by Rafael Leónidas Trujillo and inaugurated in 1962, one year after his death. The bridge is named after the five brothers that died in an effort to end Trujillo's regime and dictatorship in the Dominican Republic in the mid 20th century.  The anti-Trujillo legacy of the Patiño family did not begin with the brothers, but with their father who was killed in 1931 in the first anti-Trujillo insurrection of the Dominican Republic.

Construction of the monument began in 1944 on the orders of then-dictator Rafael Trujillo. Monumento a los Héroes de la Restauración Trujillo was assassinated in 1961, after which the monument was renamed the Monumento a los Héroes de la Restauración ("Monument to the Heroes of the Restoration" in English), in honor of the Dominican Restoration War of 1863, in which the Dominican Republic regained its independence from Spain.

Museums

Sports
 
As much as the rest of the nation, Santiago residents enjoy baseball and look forward to the Dominican winter season with the local team being the Aguilas Cibaeñas. Besides baseball, basketball is also played at a professional level in the city of Santiago. The institution in charge of organizing these events is the Asociación de Baloncesto de Santiago de los Treinta Caballeros (ABASACA) Santiago de Los Caballeros is the most successful city in the Dominican Republic based on Dominican League teams. Águilas Cibaeñas is the most successful baseball team not only in the Dominican Republic, but in the Caribbean, this team has 22 National Championship, and 6 Caribbean titles. This is what causes what a lot of people call Baseballs most intense rivalry, which is a long historic Rivalry between Águilas Cibaeñas and Tigres del Licey, being  "Licey" the most popular winter league baseball team in the world, and Águilas Cibaeñas being close second.

Santiago's major baseball and basketball teams are Las Aguilas Cibaeñas and Los Metros de Santiago.

Santiago has two stadiums, and the stadiums are The Estadio Cibao home of the Aguilas Cibaeñas and The Gran Arena del Cibao home of Los Metros De Santiago

The Female Volleyball Team have claimed two bronze medals in the professional Dominican Volleyball League.

In early 2015, there was the official launch of Liga Dominicana de Fútbol in the Dominican Republic. Santiago is the first city in the country to hold a FIFA Certified Stadium, which was built in the campus of the Pontificia Universidad Catolica Madre y Maestra and became the home of the major and first city soccer team Cibao FC from Liga Dominicana de Fútbol.

Education

Santiago is home of several universities including the prestigious Pontificia Universidad Católica Madre y Maestra (PUCMM) and Universidad Tecnológica de Santiago (UTESA). Other higher learning institutions present in Santiago are: Universidad Organización & Método (O&M), Universidad Abierta para Adultos (UAPA), Universidad Nacional Evangélica and one regional campus belonging to the Universidad Autónoma de Santo Domingo

Santiago is also home to a Binational Center, the Centro Cultural Domínico-Americano (CCDA), which was founded in 1962 by a group of Dominicans and Americans living in Santiago. At the beginning, the CCDA set about providing English language courses. Later, the library was opened and included the lending of overhead projectors and documentary films. These last two were sponsored by the American Embassy.

CCDA is located on Estrella Sadhalá Avenue. These facilities of the CCDA were opened on July 23, 1962. Throughout its 50 years of existence, the CCDA has taught English language courses, painting classes and manual activities.

Transportation

Santiago has share taxis (often called carros públicos or conchos) and private and independent bus owners who form their own routes according to their demands.

The city has private bus transportation to other cities.  Bus companies include Dioni, Metro, Caribe Tours, Transporte Espinal, and Aetra Bus.

The Autopista Juan Pablo Duarte highway, officially known as DR-1, passes by the city center and connects the city directly to Santo Domingo. Other minor highways connect the city to Puerto Plata, Samaná, and the northwestern region of the country.

The Cibao International Airport serves mostly Dominicans living in the United States and other Caribbean islands like Cuba, the Turks and Caicos Islands, and Puerto Rico, as well as Panama. The airport of the city was the Santiago Municipal Airport, a regional airport that closed in March 2002. It serves destinations such as San Juan, Port-au-Prince, New York City, Miami and Santo Domingo with regular services.

On March 30, 2022, President Luis Abinader formally commenced construction of the first rapid transit system in Santiago De Los Caballeros. The Monorail project will be the first of its kind in the Caribbean and Central America. Completion is estimated at the end of 2024.

Health

Facilities include Hospital Cabral y Baez, Clínica Corominas, Hospital De Especialidades Medicas Materno Infantil, Union Médica, and Hospital Metropolitano De Santiago (HOMS), being the largest hospital in all of the Dominican Republic and in all the Caribbean.

Sites
 Estadio Cibao
 Estadio Cibao FC
 Gran Arena del Cibao Dr. Oscar Gobaira
 Monumento de Santiago

 Gran Cibao Hotel – 11 stories high, it is the largest hotel in the Cibao region. It has also been an on hold project for several years.
 Light Rail in Santiago – A Light Rail development in the city's metro area has been proposed. If completed it will be the second city In the nation to have a mass transit system and would be  longer than the Metro of Santo Domingo. The Light Rail will have 12 stops, its route will be from the Cemetery to the Airport. Construction was scheduled to begin in October 2007 but currently the project has been delayed and on Hold.
 Electric "Highway" from Santo Domingo – Santiago's power comes from Puerto Plata, but the government commenced the building of the Electric "Highway" that will feed Santiago electric energy from Santo Domingo's generators. construction started in February 2007.
 Parque Central de Santiago The industrialists of Santiago have defended the project since it is considered to be a solution to the lack of green spaces suitable for relaxation in the city. Nevertheless, it has been argued that the granting of contracts for the different phases from this project violate the frame of transparency and legality.
In the Strategic Plan of Santiago it is indicated that the construction of the Metropolitan Park would increase the Santiagos green area from its currently 1.1% to 4%.

 Santiago Inteligente and Santiago Massive Training Program (SMART)-An initiative launched by Eddy Martinez Manzueta during his tenure at the Center for Exports and Investment of the Dominican Republic (CEI-RD, 2004-2012), and the Plan Estrategico de Santiago seeking to foster the new regional economic development and branding strategy and the promotion of Santiago as a knowledge-based production center in both conventional and emerging sectors, including Health Tourism, ITES-BPO, biotechnology and agro-business, as well as High-value manufacturing and Fashion (textiles and apparel, footwear), among others.

Recreation
Some of the recreational places found in Santiago are:

Centro Español: located in the Panamericana Avenue, this place is heavily frequented during the summer by Santiago's local population and tourists. Many activities take place in it, such as sports; swimming, basketball, baseball, softball, football, golf, table games, and children summer camps. They also host parties with famous Dominican and international artists. Its access is restricted to registered members only.
Gurabito Country Club: Another popular club located in Panamericana Avenue, it is another recreational center. They have sports activities, such as baseball and basketball. Parties with Dominican artist take place periodically in this club as well as some pool parties with Dominicans singers. Access is restricted to members only.
Mundo Acuático: Located in Hispanoamericana Avenue too, is a water theme park. This locale is open to the general public. Renamed from Kaskada Park to Mundo Acuatico.

Notable people from Santiago de los Caballeros

Actors, artists, musicians, writers
Johnny Pacheco – musician
Fernando Cabrera – poet, visual artist and songwriter
Aisha Syed Castro – violinist
Laura García-Godoy – actress
Eddy Herrera – Merengue singer
Krisspy – Merengue singer
Clara Ledesma – painter
Ñico Lora – Merengue musician
La Materialista – rapper and actress
Manny Pérez – actor
Frank Perozo – actor
Mu-Kien Adriana Sang – historian, essayist, analyst, political scientist, and academic
Luis Vargas – Bachata singer
Julio Vega Batlle – author and diplomat
Miguel Vila Luna – architect and painter
Natti Natasha – musician
Clarissa Molina – actress

Athletes
Edward Cabrera – baseball player for the Miami Marlins
Luis Felipe Lopez – 1st Dominican born player drafted in the 1st round of the 1998 NBA Draft
 Reyes Moronta – baseball pitcher for the San Francisco Giants
Franquelis Osoria – baseball player
Francisco Peña – baseball player for the New York Mets; son of Tony Peña and brother of Tony Peña Jr.
Ramón Peña – former baseball relief pitcher and member of the famous baseball Pena family
Tony Peña Jr. – baseball player
Jhonny Peralta – baseball player
Hipólito Pichardo – former baseball of the Kansas City Royals, Boston Red Sox and the Houston Astros
Luis Polonia – baseball player
Luis Pujols – former baseball player
José Cabrera – MLB player for the Houston Astros, Atlanta Braves and the Milwaukee Brewers
José Lima – baseball player
Ángel Berroa – baseball player
Jose Reyes – baseball player for the New York Mets
Joaquín Benoit – baseball player
Rafael Belliard – baseball player and cousin of Washington Nationals 2B Ronnie Belliard
Carlos Almanzar – baseball player
Bill Castro–MLB player for the Milwaukee Brewers, New York Yankees, and the Kansas City Royals; pitching coach of the Milwaukee Brewers
Carlos Gómez – baseball player for the Texas Rangers
Leonardo Cruz – boxer
Bernie Castro – baseball player
Winston Llenas – former baseball player
Al Alburquerque – baseball player
Víctor Díaz – baseball player for the Baltimore Orioles
Leo Garcia – former baseball player
Robinson Checo – former baseball player
Rudy Hernández – former baseball player
Victor Martinez – IFBB bodybuilder, runner-up many years for Mr. Olympia
Marcos Diplan – Major League Baseball pitcher
Victor Estrella Burgos – tennis player, first Dominican to win an ATP tournament, first Dominican on the ATP top 100
Luis Silverio – former baseball player who is now a coach
Alfredo Simón – baseball player for the Baltimore Orioles
Julián Tavárez – baseball player
Carlos Triunfel – baseball for the Seattle Mariners organization
Carlos Villanueva – MLB player for the Toronto Blue Jays
Ramon Antonio Nery – boxer

Politicians
Joaquín Balaguer – Dominican President
Salvador Jorge Blanco – Dominican President, lawyer and a writer
Rafael Filiberto Bonnelly – Dominican President, lawyer, scholar and diplomat
Ulises Francisco Espaillat – Dominican President, and author
Rafael Estrella Ureña – Dominican President
Antonio Guzmán Fernández – Dominican President
Hipólito Mejía – Dominican President
Francisco Augusto Lora – Dominican Vice President, Ambassador to Washington, USA, lawyer

Other
Rosa Smester Marrero – educator and feminist writer, who founded a hospice and school in the city.
Miguel Cocco – businessman
Martha Heredia – Latin American Idol
Amelia Vega – Miss Dominican Republic 2002, Miss Universe 2003
Mons. Agripino Núñez Collado – former rector of Pontificia Universidad Católica Madre y Maestra
Clarissa Molina – Miss Dominican Republic 2015 - Nuestra Bellaza Latina VIP 2016

Twin towns – sister cities
Santiago has twinning agreements with the following sister cities:
 Fort Myers, Florida (United States)
 Havana (Cuba)
 Santiago de Compostela (Spain)
  San Juan, Puerto Rico (United States) 
  Mayagüez, Puerto Rico (United States)

Photo gallery

See also

Santiago Province
Cibao region
List of cities in the Dominican Republic
Dominican War of Independence
History of the Dominican Republic

References

External links

Official site of the Santiago City Council

 
Populated places in Santiago Province (Dominican Republic)
Municipalities of the Dominican Republic
1495 establishments in the Spanish West Indies
Populated places established in the 1490s
Populated places established in 1506